Leroy James Clampitt (born October 24, 1992), formerly known as Big Taste, is a Grammy-nominated producer, songwriter and multi-instrumentalist from Pirongia, New Zealand, based in Los Angeles, California. Leroy has co-written and produced songs for artists including Justin Bieber, Madison Beer, Sabrina Carpenter, Laufey, Mallrat, and Ashe. Clampitt was awarded APRA's prestigious 'The 1,000,000,000 List', which acknowledges extraordinary success from songwriters who had accumulated over one billion streams globally for an original song.

Select discography

See also
 New Zealand American
 List of Universal Music Group artists

References

External links
BABZ inc.
Allmusic.com

1992 births
Living people
New Zealand record producers
New Zealand songwriters
Male songwriters
People from Waikato